Hincovce is a village and municipality in the Spišská Nová Ves District in the Košice Region of central-eastern Slovakia.

History
In historical records the village was first mentioned in 1320.

Geography
The village lies at an altitude of 435 metres and covers an area of 6.488 km².
It has a population of about 205 people.

Genealogical resources

The records for genealogical research are available at the state archive "Statny Archiv in Levoca, Slovakia"

 Roman Catholic church records (births/marriages/deaths): 1779-1896 (parish B)

See also
 List of municipalities and towns in Slovakia

External links
http://en.e-obce.sk/obec/hincovce/hincovce.html
https://archive.today/20121224202711/http://www.obechincovce.meu.zoznam.sk/
https://web.archive.org/web/20080208225314/http://www.statistics.sk/mosmis/eng/run.html 
Surnames of living people in Hincovce

Villages and municipalities in Spišská Nová Ves District